Founded in 2003, Amigo Energy is an electric utility seller in Texas. Amigo Energy is a subsidiary of Just Energy Group Inc., a publicly traded company (TSX:JE) with 1.8 million active customers across North America.

History

Amigo Energy was founded in 2003.
 
In May, 2007 the company merged with Fulcrum Power Services which subsequently acquired Tara Energy.

In August 2007, Amigo signed a four-year, $7.5 million sponsorship agreement for Amigo Energy to become the jersey sponsor for the Houston Dynamo, a Major League Soccer team.

In August 2011, Fulcrum, including its subsidiary Amigo, was acquired by Canadian firm Just Energy.

Industry
Amigo Energy is an electricity retailer that operates as one of 71 independent power marketers participating in deregulation of the Texas electricity market.  Amigo ranks as the 17th largest power marketer by number of consumers according to a 2009 U.S. Energy Information Administration report. Texas began the process of deregulation in 2002. The Public Utility Commission of Texas (PUCT) enforces customer protection laws for the citizens of Texas and provides access to consumer information.

References

External links
Official Website
Texas Government-Sponsored Comparison Site
Public Utility Commission of Texas

Electric power companies of the United States
Companies based in Houston